Boilermakers Union can refer to:
Amalgamated Society of Boilermakers, Shipwrights, Blacksmiths and Structural Workers, a defunct trade union in the United Kingdom
Boilermakers' Society of Australia, a defunct trade union in Australia
Boilermakers and Blacksmiths Society of Australia, a defunct trade union in Australia
GMB (trade union), a trade union in the United Kingdom
International Brotherhood of Boilermakers, Iron Ship Builders, Blacksmiths, Forgers and Helpers, a trade union in the United States of America

See also 
Boilermaking